Hrastovec pod Bočem is a settlement in the Municipality of Poljčane in northeastern Slovenia. It lies in the foothills of Mount Boč above the right bank of the Dravinja River. The area is part of the traditional region of Styria. It is now included with the rest of the municipality in the Drava Statistical Region.

Name
The settlement was formerly simply named Hrastovec but it was renamed Hrastovec pod Bočem in 1998.

Cultural heritage
A small chapel in the settlement is dedicated to Saint Barbara, patron saint of miners, and was built in 1813 near the Kleče Mine.

References

External links
Hrastovec pod Bočem on Geopedia

Populated places in the Municipality of Poljčane